Dionte Lamont Christmas (born September 15, 1986) is an American former professional basketball player for Ciclista Olímpico of the Liga Nacional de Básquet. He played college basketball for Temple.

High school career
Christmas attended Samuel S. Fels High School in Philadelphia, Pennsylvania. As a junior in 2002–03, he averaged 17.7 points per game, earning honorable mention all-Public honors. As a senior in 2003–04, he averaged 26.5 points per game, earning first team all-Public League and third team all-City honors.

After completing his education at Samuel Fels, Christmas prepped for a year at Lutheran Christian Academy in 2004–05. He ranked among the Top 40 prep school players in the nation by Hoop Scoop's Clark Francis after averaging 18 points per game while leading his team to a 35–3 record. He was also an all-tournament selection at the 2005 National Prep Invitational held at the University of Rhode Island.

Collegiate career
In his freshman season at Temple, Christmas played in all 32 games, making lone start in final game of season against Akron. He averaged 3.5 points per game, sixth best on squad and tops among reserves.

In his sophomore season, he played in all 30 games, starting 29, as he earned second team All-District and All-Atlantic 10 honors, and was named the Atlantic 10's Most Improved Player. He also earned first team All-Philadelphia Big 5, Big 5 Most Improved Player, and picked up Cy Kaselman and Palumbo awards as city-league's top free throw percentage leader and scoring champion, respectively. In 30 games, he averaged 20.0 points, 4.2 rebounds, 2.1 assists and 1.4 steals per game.

In his junior season, he started all 34 games averaging 37.2 minutes per game. He was named the Most Outstanding Player of the Atlantic 10 Tournament, and earned first team All-Atlantic 10 and first team Big 5 honors. He also earned USBWA first team All-District and NABC second team All-District honors. He became just the third person to win back to back A-10 scoring titles, averaging 19.7 points per game. He also averaged 5.9 rebounds, 2.5 assists and 1.4 steals per game.

In his senior season, he was named to the All-Atlantic 10 first team and the Atlantic 10 Tournament Most Outstanding Player for the second straight year. In 34 games, he averaged 19.5 points, 5.8 rebounds, 2.9 assists and 1.5 steals per game.

Christmas finished his Temple career with 2,043 points, becoming only the fourth player in school history to eclipse the 2000-point mark. During his senior season, he set school records for most three-pointers in a season (107) and career (317). He ranks in Temple's all-time top ten in three-pointers attempted and three-point field goal percentage. He is also the first player to lead the Atlantic 10 in scoring for three consecutive seasons.

College statistics

Professional career

2009–10 season
After going undrafted in the 2009 NBA draft, Christmas joined the Philadelphia 76ers/New Jersey Nets combined team for the Orlando Summer League and the Los Angeles Clippers for the Las Vegas Summer League. On September 28, 2009, he signed with the 76ers. However, he was later waived by the 76ers on October 21, 2009.

On January 4, 2010, he signed with Hapoel Afula of Israel for the rest of the 2009–10 season.

2010–11 season
In July 2010, Christmas joined the Sacramento Kings for the 2010 NBA Summer League. On August 4, 2010, he signed with Mersin of Turkey for the 2010–11 season. On January 28, 2011, he parted ways with Mersin.

On February 15, 2011, he signed with ČEZ Basketball Nymburk of the Czech Republic for the rest of the season. In April 2011, he left ČEZ Nymburk and joined P.A.O.K. B.C. of Greece for the rest of the season.

2011–12 season
On October 18, 2011, Christmas signed with Rethymno Aegean B.C. of Greece for the 2011–12 season. In 26 games, he averaged 18.6 points, 4.4 rebounds, 3.0 assists and 1.6 steals per game.

2012–13 season
In July 2012, Christmas joined the Boston Celtics for the 2012 NBA Summer League. On July 31, 2012, he signed with the Celtics. However, he was later waived by the Celtics on October 16, 2012.

On October 31, 2012, he signed with CSKA Moscow of Russia for the 2012–13 season. On February 21, 2013, he was waived by CSKA. On April 10, 2013, he signed with Montepaschi Siena of Italy for the rest of the season.

2013–14 season
In July 2013, Christmas joined the Utah Jazz for the Orlando Summer League and the Phoenix Suns for the Las Vegas Summer League. On September 13, 2013, he signed with the Suns. On November 1, 2013, he made his NBA debut, recording 9 points and 4 rebounds in an 87–84 victory over the Utah Jazz.

2014–15 season
In July 2014, Christmas re-joined the Phoenix Suns for the 2014 NBA Summer League. On July 24, 2014, he was waived by the Suns. On September 26, 2014, he signed with the New Orleans Pelicans. However, he was later waived by the Pelicans on October 17, 2014.

On November 12, 2014, Christmas signed with Paris-Levallois for the rest of the 2014–15 LNB Pro A season.

2015–16 season
On October 10, 2015, Christmas signed with the Cleveland Cavaliers. However, he was waived on October 23 after appearing in four preseason games. On December 1, he signed with Hapoel Holon of the Israeli Basketball Premier League. On January 7, 2016, he was released by Holon in order for him to sign with AEK Athens of Greece for the rest of the season. On February 9, he parted ways with AEK after appearing in just four games. On March 27, he signed with Torku Konyaspor of Turkey for the rest of the 2015–16 BSL season.

2016–17 season
On October 24, 2016, Christmas signed with the Philadelphia 76ers, but was waived the same day. Five days later, he was acquired by the Delaware 87ers of the NBA Development League as an affiliate of the 76ers. On February 7, 2017, Christmas suffered a right Achilles tendon rupture and was subsequently ruled out for the season. He was waived later that day. In 31 games with the Sevens, he averaged 14.9 points, 3.5 rebounds and 3.2 assists in 31.6 minutes.

2017–18 season
On January 25, 2018, Christmas signed with Ciclista Olímpico of the Liga Nacional de Básquet.

Career statistics

NBA

Regular season

|-
| style="text-align:left;"| 
| style="text-align:left;"| Phoenix
| 31 || 0 || 6.4 || .355 || .290 || .750 || 1.2 || .3 || .1 || .1 || 2.3
|-
| style="text-align:center;" colspan="2"|Career
| 31 || 0 || 6.4 || .355 || .290 || .750 || 1.2 || .3 || .1 || .1 || 2.3

EuroLeague

|-
| style="text-align:left;"| 2012–13
| style="text-align:left;"| CSKA Moscow
| 13 || 6 || 15.2 || .483 || .556 || .727 || 1.1 || .7 || .4 || .1 || 6.5 || 4.2
|-
| style="text-align:center;" colspan="2"|Career
| 13 || 6 || 15.2 || .483 || .556 || .727 || 1.1 || .7 || .4 || .1 || 6.5 || 4.2

See also
 2009 NCAA Men's Basketball All-Americans

References

External links

 NBA.com profile 
 TBLStat.net Profile
 All-American Candidate flyer

1986 births
Living people
ABA League players
AEK B.C. players
American expatriate basketball people in Argentina
American expatriate basketball people in the Czech Republic
American expatriate basketball people in France
American expatriate basketball people in Greece
American expatriate basketball people in Israel
American expatriate basketball people in Italy
American expatriate basketball people in Russia
American expatriate basketball people in Turkey
American men's basketball players
Basketball players from Philadelphia
Basketball Nymburk players
Ciclista Olímpico players
Delaware 87ers players
Hapoel Afula players
Hapoel Holon players
Mens Sana Basket players
Mersin Büyükşehir Belediyesi S.K. players
P.A.O.K. BC players
Metropolitans 92 players
PBC CSKA Moscow players
Phoenix Suns players
Rethymno B.C. players
Shooting guards
Temple Owls men's basketball players
Torku Konyaspor B.K. players
Undrafted National Basketball Association players